Kintyre Pursuivant of Arms was a Scottish pursuivant of arms of the Court of the Lord Lyon.

The Kintyre Pursuivant was formerly a private officer of arms in the service of the Lord of the Isles, but along with Dingwall Pursuivant, Ross Herald, and Islay Herald became an officer of arms to the Scottish Crown when the last Lord of the Isles forfeited his estates and titles to James IV of Scotland in 1493.

The badge of office is Two dolphins hauriant addorsed Azure enfiled of a coronet of four fleurs-de-lys (two visible) and four crosses pattee (one and two halves visible) Or.

John Charles Grossmith George held the office of Kintyre Pursuivant from 1986 to 2000, before his retirement and subsequent appointment as Linlithgow Pursuivant Extraordinary.

The office is currently vacant.

Holders of the office

See also
Officer of Arms
Pursuivant
Court of the Lord Lyon
Heraldry Society of Scotland

References

External links
The Court of the Lord Lyon



Court of the Lord Lyon
Offices of arms